Richard Virgil Dean Steinheimer (August 23, 1929 – May 4, 2011) was an American railroad photographer, often called the "Ansel Adams of railroad photography." His work has been published in Trains Magazine, Railfan, Locomotive and Railway Preservation and Vintage Rail, and more than seventy books. He lived in Sacramento, California. A pioneer in railroad photography, Steinheimer lived through and documented the railroads' heyday and their transition to diesel motive power from steam. He is one of very few photographers who appreciated the aesthetics of all locomotives, from steam engines to the latest diesel-powered behemoths. He had a particular fondness for the landscape of the American West, and many of his images situate trains in the larger geography and culture of the time. Known for taking pictures at night, in bad weather, and from risky perches on top of moving trains, Steinheimer had an enormous creativity and productivity. His photograph, "Southern Pacific steam helper at Saugus, California, 1947," was included in the Center for Railroad Photography and Art's 20 Memorable Railroad Photographs of the 20th Century.

Early life 

Richard Steinheimer was born in Chicago in 1929. His parents divorced in 1935, and he, with his mother and sister, moved to Phoenix, Arizona. It was this trip that first exposed him to trains. In 1939 his family moved to Glendale, California. The Southern Pacific main line was adjacent to his home.

Career 
In 1945 he started his photographic career with a Kodak Baby Brownie, shooting wartime traffic in the common  "wedgies" style. Also, in 1945 he received two books by Lucius Beebe, Highball and High Iron, from which he drew inspiration. By 1946 his photos had evolved into more of an experimental style. In 1946 he began using an Argus A-2 camera, and in 1947 he started using a 3×4 Speed Graphic. With the Speed Graphic now in hand, the flood gates were opened for the creation of some of the best night photos of railroads ever taken. He used yard lights, flashbulbs or whatever lights were available. His night work predates O. Winston Link's by almost seven years. By 1949 he was going to San Francisco City College and one of his teachers was Joe Rosenthal. From 1956 through 1962 he worked for the Marin Independent Journal as a photojournalist. Kalmbach Publishing produced in 1963 his Backwoods Railroad of the West. Although it failed commercially at the time, it would one day become one of the most sought-after railroad books in history.

From 1948 through 2001 Trains Magazine published over 400 of his photographs.

Steinheimer has become recognized as one of the masters of railroad photography, especially across the Western USA, but also pursued a lesser-known career in commercial photography. His specialties included the use of telephoto lenses in railroad scenes, and a devotion to Southern Pacific's Donner Pass crossing of the Sierra Nevada.

In 2000 Steinheimer was diagnosed with Alzheimer's disease; he suffered a stroke in September 2007. He was cared for throughout his illness by his wife Shirley Burman. He died on May 4, 2011.

An exhibition featuring many of his iconic images was held at the Robert Mann Gallery in Manhattan, December 15, 2011, through January 21, 2012.

The majority of Richard Steinheimer's photography collection was donated to the Center for Railroad Photography & Art in mid 2022. The Center has received about 30,000 color slides and a large collection of black and white prints and scans, and negatives from 1975 onward.

References 

 Richard Steinheimer (photographs) and Jeff Brouws (text), A Passion for Trains: The Railroad Photography of Richard Steinheimer, W. W. Norton & Company (2004), .

Online references 
 The Center for Railroad Photography and Art
 Amazon ad for A Passion for Trains

External links 
 Richard Steinheimer Photograph Collection, DeGolyer Library, Southern Methodist University.

1929 births
2011 deaths
American photographers
Rail transport photographers
Deaths from dementia in California
Deaths from Alzheimer's disease